The France mixed national 3x3 team is a national basketball team of France, administered by the Fédération Française de Basketball.

It represents the country in international 3x3 (3 against 3) mixed basketball competitions. (a "mixed" team consists of 2 men and 2 women)

See also
France men's national 3x3 team
France women's national 3x3 team

References

Mixed national 3x3 basketball teams
3